Tatyana Petrova Petkova (Bulgarian Cyrillic: Татяна Петрова Петкова; born November 3, 1973), better known simply as Tanya Boeva is a Bulgarian pop and Chalga singer.

Biography 
Tanya Boeva was born on November 3, 1973, in the town of Topolovgrad, but lived, studied and grew up in Dimitrovgrad. She showed her musical talent at the age of two, and her parents noticed it. When she was 13, she started singing in a school group called "Alchemists", and later she sang in various pubs. With the same group she won her first prize - "Golden Badge", at a festival in Haskovo. The performer started her professional career in 1994 when she recorded several songs with the Dimitrovgrad Orchestra. In 1995, she took part in the then Golden Orpheus, where she won the Young Artist Award with the song Космичен блус. The following year she again participated in the festival with the song Сребрее косата ти рано, мамо in a duet with Daniela Petkova, and won second prize. [2] Following a contract with the music company Payner, Boeva released her debut album in 1997, containing only pop-songs. The album is called Обичай ме с нежност и душа  and the songs in it written by Dimitar Getov, Nayden Andreev, Vassil Iliev and Haigashod Agassyan. Boeva received popularity and success after working with her producers of Ara Audio with which she released the album Дама пика in 1999. Since 2002, Tanya Boeva has been a self-producing performer, with the exception of In a short period of time partnering with Ara Music, who have acted as her managers.

Personal life

Tanya is married to Michaud Burgundzhiev and has a son called Rosen who was born in 2007.  In 2011, Tanya gave birth to a second son but he died 2 weeks afterwards from an unknown cause.

Discography
Obichaj me s nezhnost i dusha - 1997
Shtastliva säm - 1998
Dama pika - 1999
Cherni ochi - 2000
Shock - 2001
Tanya Boeva - 2003
Lutam Se - 2004
Losho Momche - 2006
Losha Terapia - 2010

References

External links
 - The official website of Tanya Boeva

1973 births
Living people
20th-century Bulgarian women singers
Bulgarian pop singers
Bulgarian folk-pop singers
21st-century Bulgarian women singers